Gosht, is a city in the Central District of Saravan County, Sistan and Baluchestan province, Iran. At the 2016 census, its population was 4,996, in 1,508 families.

Location
The city is between two Saravan and Khash cities and on the road of these two cities.  From the south-east to Saravan is 65 km away and from the northwest to the Khash city with a distance of 95 km.

People
Most people in Gosht are Baloch and most people speak the Balochi language.

Tourism
MirOmar Salti Hill

Historical Castle

Rock paintings

Tonp Dirt Hill

Hozeh Einol Oloum

References

Saravan County
Populated places in Saravan County